A-Prince (Hangul: 에이프린스) was a South Korean boy band formed by New Planet Entertainment in Seoul, South Korea. The group debuted on July 25, 2012 with "You're The Only One".

Members
 Sungwon (성원)
 Minhyuk (민혁)
 Seungjun (승준)
 Siyoon (시윤)
 Woobin (우빈)

Discography

Extended plays

Single albums

References

K-pop music groups
South Korean boy bands
South Korean dance music groups
Musical groups from Seoul
Musical groups established in 2012
2012 establishments in South Korea
Musical groups disestablished in 2015
2015 disestablishments in South Korea
South Korean pop music groups